Haplochrois galapagosalis is a moth in the family Elachistidae. It was described by Bernard Landry in 2001. It is found on the Galápagos Islands.

The length of the forewings is 4–6 mm. The ground colour of the forewings is beige to dark greyish brown. The hindwings are uniformly greyish brown. Adults have been recorded on wing from January to May.

Etymology
The species is named for the Ecuadorian archipelago where it was collected.

References

Moths described in 2001
Elachistidae
Moths of South America